Randy Gregg is the name of:
Randy Gregg (ice hockey) (born 1956)
Randy Gregg (musician) (20th century), bass guitarist